Chah Dadkhoda Rural District is a rural district (dehestan) in Chah Dadkhoda District, Qaleh Ganj County, Kerman Province, Iran. At the 2006 census, its population was 11,979, in 2,517 families. The rural district has 39 villages. One such village is Pakelat.

References 

Rural Districts of Kerman Province
Qaleh Ganj County